Gombau is a surname. Notable people with the surname include:

Berenguer Gombau (died 1551), Italian Roman Catholic prelate 
Josep Gombau (born 1976), Spanish association football coach